Bill Berg may refer to:

 William Berg (classicist) (1938–2021), American classicist
 Bill Berg (ice hockey) (born 1967), Canadian ice hockey player
 Bill Berg (musician), American drummer in jazz and fusion music
 Bill Berg (politician) (1939–1967), Royal Canadian Mounted police man, game outfitter and politician

See also
William Berg (disambiguation)